The Crown of Empress Eugénie is the consort crown that was made for Eugénie de Montijo, the empress consort of Napoleon III, Emperor of the French. Although neither she or her husband had a coronation ceremony, a crown was specially created for her on the occasion of the 1855 Exposition Universelle in Paris. The gold crown is set with diamonds and emeralds in eagle and palmette motifs, and it is topped by a monde.

During the same period, a crown was made for Napoleon III, which was known as the Crown of Napoleon III. After her husband was overthrown in 1870, following the Franco-Prussian War, they lived in exile at Chislehurst in England. He died in January 1873, and she died in July 1920.

Most of the French Crown Jewels were sold by the Third Republic in 1885, including the Crown of Napoleon III. However, the Crown of Empress Eugénie was returned to the former empress, who bequeathed it to Princess Marie-Clotilde Bonaparte. It subsequently came up for auction in 1988, after which it was donated by  Roberto Polo to the Louvre museum in Paris, where it is now on display.

References

External links 
 Empress Eugénie's Crown at the Louvre museum's website.

French monarchy
Eugenie
French Crown Jewels